Lake Ka-ho is a village in Cahokia Township, Macoupin County, Illinois, United States. It was incorporated in 2000. The population was 194 at the 2020 census, down from 237 in 2010.

The village is part of the St. Louis, MO–IL Metropolitan Statistical Area.

Geography
The village is in southeastern Macoupin County, surrounding Lake Ka-Ho, a reservoir built on a tributary of Panther Creek. It is just south of Mount Olive Lake, a reservoir built on Panther Creek. The reservoirs are in the watershed of Cahokia Creek, which flows west-southwest to the Mississippi River near St. Louis.

Interstate 55 passes just southeast of the village limits, with access from Exit 44 west of Mount Olive.

Demographics

References

Villages in Macoupin County, Illinois
Villages in Illinois
Populated places established in 2000
2000 establishments in Illinois